Kabou is a surname. Notable people with the surname include:

Axelle Kabou (born 1955), Cameroonian journalist
Fabienne Kabou (born 1977), French convicted murderer
Rafik Kabou (born 1992), Tunisian footballer